The 1970 season of the Venezuelan Primera División, the top category of Venezuelan football, was played by 8 teams. The national champions were Deportivo Galicia.

Results

First stage

Second stage

Championship playoff

External links
Venezuela 1970 season at RSSSF

Ven
Venezuelan Primera División seasons
Primera